Safran (Euronext: SAF) is a French conglomerate involved in defense, aerospace propulsion and equipment.

Safran, Sáfrán and Şafran are surnames. People with those names include:

 Alexandru Șafran (19102006), Romanian and Swiss rabbi
 Don Safran (19302014), American film and television screenwriter, producer and marketing executive
Hannah Safran (born 1950), Israeli feminist, activist and researcher
 Henri Safran (born 1932), French-born Australian television director
 Jeremy D. Safran (1952–2018), Canadian-American clinical psychologist
 John Safran (born 1972), Australian documentary maker and media personality
 Jonathan Safran Foer (born 1977), American writer
 Joshua Safran (active 2014), American television producer and writer
 Mátyás Sáfrán (born 1986), Hungarian sprint canoer
 Mihály Sáfrán (born 1985), Hungarian sprint canoer
 Nadav Safran (19252003), Egyptian expert in Arab and Middle East politics
 Naomi Safran-Hon (born 1984), Israeli artist
 Peter Safran (born 1965), American film producer and manager
 Roald Safran (birth name of Roald Hoffmann, born 1937), American theoretical chemist who won the 1981 Nobel Prize in Chemistry
 Scott Safran (196789), American video gamer
 William Safran (born 1930), American academic in political science

See also 
 Renault Safrane, an executive car manufactured 19922000
 Saffron, a spice
 Safran SR305-230, a diesel piston aircraft engine manufactured by SMA Engines